Zheleznodorozhny City District is the name of several city divisions in Russia. The name literally means "pertaining to rail transport".

 Zheleznodorozhny City District, Barnaul, a city district of Barnaul, the administrative center of Altai Krai
 Zheleznodorozhny Administrative District, an administrative district of the city of Chita, the administrative center of Zabaykalsky Krai
 Zheleznodorozhny City District, Khabarovsk, a city district of Khabarovsk, the administrative center of Khabarovsk Krai
 Zheleznodorozhny City District, Krasnoyarsk, a city district of Krasnoyarsk, the administrative center of Krasnoyarsk Krai
 Zheleznodorozhny Okrug, Kursk, an okrug of the city of Kursk, the administrative center of Kursk Oblast
 Zheleznodorozhny City District, Novosibirsk, a city district of Novosibirsk, the administrative center of Novosibirsk Oblast
 Zheleznodorozhny City District, Oryol, a city district of Oryol, the administrative center of Oryol Oblast
 Zheleznodorozhny City District, Penza, a city district of Penza, the administrative center of Penza Oblast
 Zheleznodorozhny City District, Rostov-on-Don, a city district of Rostov-on-Don, the administrative center of Rostov Oblast
 Zheleznodorozhny City District, Ryazan, a city district of Ryazan, the administrative center of Ryazan Oblast
 Zheleznodorozhny City District, Samara, an administrative and municipal city district of Samara, the administrative center of Samara Oblast
 Zheleznodorozhny City District, Ulan-Ude, a city district of Ulan-Ude, the capital of the Republic of Buryatia
 Zheleznodorozhny City District, Ulyanovsk, a city district of Ulyanovsk, the administrative center of Ulyanovsk Oblast
 Zheleznodorozhny City District, Voronezh, a city district of Voronezh, the administrative center of Voronezh Oblast
 Zheleznodorozhny City District, Yekaterinburg, a city district of Yekaterinburg, the administrative center of Sverdlovsk Oblast

See also 
 Zheleznodorozhny (disambiguation)
 Zheleznodorozhny Okrug (disambiguation)

References